Every Bastard a King (translit. Kol Mamzer Melech) is a 1968 Israeli drama film directed by Uri Zohar. The film was selected as the Israeli entry for the Best Foreign Language Film at the 41st Academy Awards, but was not accepted as a nominee.

Plot
The story focuses on an American reporter who visits Israel with his girlfriend. While there, he becomes friendly with the Arabs and Israelis. Before long things change and he soon learns that war will break out. The film is set just before the 1967 Six Day War.

Cast
 Yehoram Gaon as Yoram
 Oded Kotler as Raphi Cohen
 Pier Angeli as Eileen
 William Berger as Roy Hemmings
 Ori Levy as Foreign Office Official (as Uri Levy)
 Reuven Morgan as The Photographer
 Ariela Shavid as Anat

See also
 List of submissions to the 41st Academy Awards for Best Foreign Language Film
 List of Israeli submissions for the Academy Award for Best Foreign Language Film

References

External links
 

1968 films
Israeli drama films
1960s Hebrew-language films
1968 drama films
Films directed by Uri Zohar
Films set in the 1960s
Films about the Israel Defense Forces
Films scored by Michel Colombier